is a brand of cigarettes produced by Japan Tobacco.

History
Seven Stars was launched on February 1, 1969 as the first cigarette with a charcoal filter. The brand uses domestically blended tobaccos, mainly used from domestic leaf tobacco, and it is still popular in the top sales performance amongst all JTI brands. The original soft pack recorded the 1st ranking of sales from 1975 to 1977 and after that it was ranked 2nd in sales following the original light and super light of the derivative product Mild Seven (present: Mevius) which became the most popular brand, but in the 2008 Seven Stars had returned to the 1st ranking in sales for the first quarter (April - June) and continued to defend its position up until 2016. The nickname is "Seta", "Bunta" and so on. The Menthol variant has the nickname "SETAMEN".

Changes in the design and length of wrapping paper and chip paper have been made several times, but conspicuous design change of the star crimp package has not been done since the launch. (It was changed to King size in 1993 And in 1999 some changes were made to the "Seven Stars" logo on the packs). Since the beginning of the 21st century, low-tar products and menthol products are also sold. The "Seven Star Black Charcoal Menthol Box" was released on August 3, 2009 (renewed to Seven Star Solid Menthol Box at the end of February 2011). The activated carbon is made with special membrane by adopting "Advanced Charcoal Tec Filter" which prevented covering and adsorption of the menthol, it was released as a product adopting charcoal filter for menthol tobacco for the first time in Japan. However, when it was re-renewed to "Seven Star Menthol 8 Box" on April 14, 2014, the filter had been changed to a plain filter.

In addition, due to the increase in tobacco tax on October 1, 2010 and the consumption tax increase on April 1, 2014 , all Seven Star variants were raised to 440 and 460 Yen respectively.

By the middle of March 2012, JTI used high intensity ink for the star brick color (gold / silver) in the original 2 types, medium, light packs, the color of the star pattern of the seal paper was changed from white to silver and a change was made that enhanced the silver shine of the opening tape and glossy. In mid April 2014, 3 kinds of menthol were renewed to 3 brands which blended fully ripened leaves, renewed. The tar of the medium and light variants were lowered to 10 and 7 mg in the middle of June, and in 10/7 / 4/1 mg in early July a soft pack variant was released for both.

Although the basic design of all products except the cutting menthol was unified with the original, the regular was the color of the seal paper and the part of 7, while the menthol was identified by the green density of the background, but it was hard to understand from far away. From the middle of June 2015, the tar of the silver variant was lowered to 10 mg and 7 mg, 4 mg and 1 mg were changed to golden and silver seal paper in black ground, menthol changed the background color to a more distinct color and the tar value notation is displayed more prominently.  
 
It is packaged as king size (85 mm), 20 cigarettes in a hard pack. The brand was created in response to customer demands for a low tar, menthol and D-spec (low smoke smell) product.

The Seven Star Tree became an overnight sensation when its image was used on a package of Seven Star cigarettes. It is a scenic spot that represents the beautiful scenery of the hills of Biei, Hokkaido.

Marketing
In the middle of the 1990s and early 2000s, there was a time when Toyoshikawa Etsushi in the original series, Sugimoto Tetsuta in the custom light (present medium) and Quartz in the Menthol series were appointed. From 2007 to 2011, BOOM BOOM SATELLITES , CHAKI ( THE LOWBROWS ), Ohno Masao (ripvanwinkle) was appointed on the Web and magazine advertisements, entitled "Men who resonate with Seven Stars". The catchphrase of Seven Star is "Silent Man" (1996), "Silent Smoke" (1998 - 2001), "Seven Stars Men" (2003) and "Quietly and expanding" (2007 - 2011). Menthol series is "Menthol tasteable" and "Strong, menthol strong". The catch phrase at the time of design change of the custom light and menthol light of 2002 was custom light "ALL NEW", menthol light "BOX NEW". The catch phrase at the time of release of Black Charcoal Menthol was "Japan's only. The sharpness was extremely, charcoal menthol.", The catchphrase of the discontinued product is black and impact "is clearly crispy taste, it stands outstanding black".. The catchphrase of the Light menthol is "Deep menthol is deep and sharp, Deep Menthol" Solid Menthol is "Sharpness stands out. Solid Menthol", Alaska Menthol "Extreme Coldness Alaska menthol." And the snap box was "PLAY! SNAP".

The catch phrase of each product now is the same as the original phrase "Only one, certain taste", Medium "Do not distract, Fun", Wright "Sharpened, Treated", Real Rich" , Melisole series is "Menthol, ripe taste umami", Cutting Menthol is "Ultra fine menthol, one point concentrated".

Markets
Seven Stars are mainly sold in Japan, but also were or still are sold in Singapore, Austria, Ukraine and Afghanistan.

Sport sponsorship
Seven Stars sponsored the Honda team (it was known as the "Seven Star Honda" team) in the Suzuka 8 Hours. Two bikes were entered in 2003, and in 2004 the drivers (which were Tohru Ukawa and Izutsu Yoshiyasu) won the race in 2004. The team once again won in 2005 (with the drivers being Tohru Ukawa and Ryuichi Kiyonari). Also, Seven Stars Honda limited packs were sold at Suzuka Circuit during the eight seasons.

Products
Seven Stars (Soft Pack/Box)
Seven Stars Medium (Box)
Seven Stars Lights (Box)
Seven Stars Black Impact (Soft Pack)
Seven Stars Menthol (Box)
Seven Stars Lights Menthol (Soft Pack/Box)
Seven Stars Black Charcoal Menthol (Box)
Seven Stars Revo Lights Menthol
Seven Stars Revo Super Lights

Below are all the variants of Seven Stars cigarettes, with the levels of tar and nicotine included.

See also
Japan Tobacco
Smoking in Japan
Fashion brands

References

Products introduced in 1969
Japanese cigarette brands
Japan Tobacco brands
Cigarette brands